Antarctodon is an extinct genus of mammals from the Early Eocene (late Ypresian age). It is a basal astrapotherian which lived in what is now Seymour Island, Antarctic Peninsula, at that moment still connected to South America where most of the astrapotherians were found. The holotype and only specimen MLP 08-XI-30-1, an isolated right p4 or m1, was found in the Telm 5 Member of the La Meseta Formation in West Antarctica. It was first named by Mariano Bond, Alejandro Kramarz, Ross D. E. MacPhee and Marcelo Reguero in 2011 and the type species is Antarctodon sobrali.

Phylogeny 
Cladogram after M. Bond et al. 2011:

References

Bibliography 
 

Meridiungulata
Eocene mammals
Cenozoic animals of Antarctica
Cenozoic mammals of Antarctica
Paleogene Antarctica
Fossils of Antarctica
Fossil taxa described in 2011
Extinct animals of Antarctica
Prehistoric placental genera